Ackerville is an unincorporated community in the town of Polk, Washington County, Wisconsin, United States. It is located on Wisconsin Highway 175 and Sherman Road, just due east of Wisconsin Highway 164 and south of the village of Slinger. It is less than 7 miles from Richfield and approximately 10 miles from Germantown.

References

Unincorporated communities in Washington County, Wisconsin
Unincorporated communities in Wisconsin